The Shaw Festival is a not-for-profit theatre festival in Niagara-on-the-Lake, Ontario, Canada. It is the second largest repertory theatre company in North America. The Shaw Festival was founded in 1962. Originally, it only featured productions written by George Bernard Shaw, but changes were later implemented by Christopher Newton and Jackie Maxwell that widened the theatre's scope. As of 2019, the theatre company was considered to be one of the largest 20 employers in the Niagara Region.

History
The Festival's roots can be traced to 1962 when Brian Doherty and Calvin Rand staged a summertime "Salute to Shaw" at the Court House Theatre. For eight weekends, Doherty and his crew produced Shaw's Don Juan in Hell and Candida.

Paxton Whitehead took over management of the company in 1967. During his tenure, he established the Festival Theatre. Queen Elizabeth II, Indira Gandhi, and Pierre Elliot Trudeau were among those who attended performances at the Shaw Festival Theatre during its inaugural season in 1973. Tony Van Bridge was the interim artistic director for the 1974–75 season. Christopher Newton had declined previous offers to serve as Artistic Director for the Shaw Festival before accepting the position in 1979. In a 2011 interview with the Globe and Mail, Newton stated that he "hadn't really liked Bernard Shaw very much" and that he "made no secret of that fact." Under Newton, the theatre produced plays that were written during the lifetime of Shaw (1856–1950). His decision to move the Shaw Festival away from the direction of museum theatre was controversial, which resulted in some members of the board directors to propose firing him, but they were not successful. The theatre stopped running at a financial deficit during Newton's tenure. His successor, Jackie Maxwell, was appointed in 2003 and expanded the theatre's scope further to include works that were set in the same time period as Shaw. By doing so, she was able to allow "strategic integration of female, Canadian and nonwhite voices into the festival's programming and casting". In 2003, a production of The Coronation Voyage was the first time a show that was written by a living playwright was featured at the Shaw Festival.

In the summer of 2015, it was announced that Tim Carroll would take over as artistic director and Tim Jennings as executive director. They announced Carroll’s inaugural 2017 season in August 2016. In 2020, most of the productions scheduled for that season were cancelled due to the COVID-19 pandemic in Ontario. The theatre company reduced financial losses through production cancelletions, donations, government subsidies, and insurance.

Artistic Directors
 Andrew Allan (1963–1965)
 Barry Morse (1966)
 Paxton Whitehead (1967–1977)
 Tony Van Bridge (1974 – 1975)
 Leslie Yeo (1979)
 Christopher Newton (1980–2002)
 Jackie Maxwell (2003–2016)
 Tim Carroll (2017–)

Theatres

On June 12, 1973, the Shaw Festival opened its first permanent theatre, the Queen's Parade.

Dates listed are when the theatre's association with the Shaw Festival began; The Court House and Royal George theatres predate the festival.
 Festival Theatre (1973, 856 seats)
 Royal George Theatre (1980, 305 seats)
 Jackie Maxwell Studio Theatre (2004, 267 seats)

Former venue: Court House Theatre (1962–2017, 327 seats)''

See also 
 Shaw Festival production history
 Stratford Festival
 Theatre of Canada

References

Bibliography

External links

Theatre companies in Ontario
Theatre festivals in Ontario
Niagara-on-the-Lake
Culture of the Regional Municipality of Niagara
Tourist attractions in the Regional Municipality of Niagara
George Bernard Shaw
1962 establishments in Ontario
Festivals established in 1962